Cephalotaxus koreana, commonly called the Korean plum yew, is a coniferous shrub or small tree in the family Taxaceae. It is native to Korea, Japan and northeast China. Some botanists consider it synonymous with C. harringtonii.

Cephalotaxus koreana contains catechin-7-O-glucoside.

References 

Flora of China
Flora of Japan
Trees of Korea
Flora of Asia
koreana
Taxa named by Takenoshin Nakai